Schönleinstraße  is a Berlin U-Bahn station located on the .
Opened in 1928 and designed by Grenander it was shortly closed in 1945 and renamed in 1951 to Kottbusser Damm. In 1992 the station was named Schönleinstrasse again.

On 25 December 2016, Deutsche Welle reported that a group of young men "attempted murder" on a homeless person at the Schönleinstraße station by setting him on fire.  Two days later, the Wall Street Journal indicated seven youths were in police custody.

On 20 February 2019, at noon, another homeless person was attacked with a knife, but he was saved by bystanders. The attack was recorded on video.

References

U8 (Berlin U-Bahn) stations
Buildings and structures in Friedrichshain-Kreuzberg
Railway stations in Germany opened in 1928